Lear or Leir may refer to:

Acronyms
 Liga de Escritores y Artistas Revolucionarios, a Mexican association of revolutionary artists and writers
 Low Energy Ion Ring, an ion pre-accelerator of the Large Hadron Collider at CERN
 Low Energy Antiproton Ring, the former name and function of the Low Energy Ion Ring
 Rapeseed, a member of the family Brassicaceae cultivated for its oil-rich seed

Arts and entertainment
 King Lear, a tragedy by William Shakespeare based on the legend of Leir of Britain
 King Leir, an anonymous 1594 play based on the legend of Leir of Britain
 Lear (play), a 1971 Edward Bond play
 Lear (opera), a 1978 opera by Aribert Reimann
 The Last Lear, a 2007 Indian play
 The Lears, a 2017 American comedy-drama film
 The Yiddish King Lear, an 1892 play
 Lear's (1988–1994), a monthly women's magazine

People
 Leir of Britain, a legendary king of the Britons
 Lear (1808 cricketer)

Surname
 Alan W. Lear (1953–2008), Scottish writer of science fiction and horror
 Amanda Lear, French singer
 Andrew Lear (born 1958), American classicist
 Ben Lear (1879–1966), United States Army general
 Bill Lear (1902–1978), American engineer, businessman and inventor 
 Edward Lear (1812–1888), English author and artist 
 Eliot Lear, member of the Internet Engineering Task Force
 Evelyn Lear (1926–2012), American operatic soprano
 Frances Lear (1923–1996), American magazine publisher
 Jonathan Lear (born 1948), philosopher
 Les Lear (1918–1979), National (U.S.) and Canadian Football League player and coach
 Louise Lear (born 1967), BBC Weather presenter
 Michael Leir, Canadian diplomat
 Moya Lear (1915–2001), an American businesswoman
 Nicholas Lear, American Civil War Medal of Honor recipient
 Norman Lear (born 1922), American television writer and producer
 Peter Lear (disambiguation)
 Roger Leir (1934–2014), American podiatric surgeon and ufologist
 Tobias Lear (1762–1816), personal secretary to President George Washington
 Thomas Lear (disambiguation)

Other uses
 Lear Corporation, an American automotive supplier
 LearAvia Lear Fan, an American turboprop business aircraft designed in the 1970s
 Learjet, an aircraft series
 Leir (Marvel Comics), a fictional character in the Marvel universe
 Lear, County Londonderry, a townland in Cumber Upper, County Londonderry, Northern Ireland
 Lear, a thickened sauce used in Battalia pie and other dishes in English Early Modern cooking
 Lear, a character in Pokémon Masters EX

See also
 Children of Lir, an Irish legend
 King Lear (disambiguation)
 LEA (disambiguation)
 Lear's macaw, a rare bird named after Edward Lear
 Lir (Irish), mythological gods of the sea
 Llŷr (Welsh), mythological gods of the sea
 Van Lear (disambiguation)
 Laer